British NVC community MG5 (Cynosurus cristatus - Centaurea nigra grassland) is one of the mesotrophic grassland communities in the British National Vegetation Classification system. It is one of four such communities associated with well-drained permanent pastures and meadows.

This community is widely distributed community though common only in certain regions. There are three subcommunities.

This type of plant community was described in 1952 as Centaureo-Cynosuretum cristati Br.-Bl. & Tx..

Community composition

The following constant species are found in this community:
 Common Bent (Agrostis capillaris)
 Sweet Vernal-grass (Anthoxanthum odoratum)
 Black Knapweed (Centaurea nigra)
 Crested Dog's-tail (Cynosurus cristatus)
 Cock's-foot (Dactylis glomerata)
 Red Fescue (Festuca rubra)
 Yorkshire-fog (Holcus lanatus)
 Common Bird's-foot Trefoil (Lotus corniculatus)
 Ribwort Plantain (Plantago lanceolata)
 Red Clover (Trifolium pratense)
 White Clover (Trifolium repens)

One rare species, Tuberous Thistle (Cirsium tuberosum), is associated with this community.

Distribution

This community is widespread in lowland areas in England, Wales and Scotland, but its abundance varies between regions. It is uncommon in southern England and East Anglia, for instance, but strong concentrations occur in the Midlands and Yorkshire.

Subcommunities

There are three subcommunities:
 the Lathyrus pratensis subcommunity
 the Galium verum subcommunity
 the Danthonia decumbens subcommunity

References

 Rodwell, J. S. (1992) British Plant Communities Volume 3 - Grasslands and montane communities  (hardback),  (paperback)
 National Vegetation Classification: MG5 grassland, by Natural England, 2 April 2013, downloadable from website here

MG05